Mădălin Răileanu (born 6 May 1997) is a Romanian professional footballer who plays as a midfielder for CSO Plopeni.

Honours

Club 

Astra Giurgiu
 Liga I (1): 2015–16

References

External links
 
 

1997 births
Living people
Sportspeople from Ploiești
Romanian footballers
Association football midfielders
Liga I players
Liga II players
Liga III players
FC Astra Giurgiu players
FC Metaloglobus București players
CS Sportul Snagov players